Two for the Road is an album by jazz guitarists Herb Ellis and Joe Pass that was released in 1974. It was the third and last album that they recorded together.

Reception

In his Allmusic review, critic Scott Yanow wrote "Pass was just beginning to gain recognition for his remarkable unaccompanied solos, but Ellis had not recorded in such a sparse setting before. They complement each other quite well..."

Track listing
 "Love for Sale" (Cole Porter) – 4:50
 "Carnival (Manha de Carnaval)" (Luiz Bonfá/Antonio Maria) – 3:29
 "Am I Blue?" (Harry Akst, Grant Clarke) – 3:08
 "Seven Come Eleven" (Charlie Christian/Benny Goodman) – 4:33
 "Guitar Blues" (Ellis/Pass) – 2:49
 "Oh, Lady Be Good!" (George Gershwin/Ira Gershwin) – 3:58
 "Cherokee" (Ray Noble) – 2:49
 "Cherokee [version 2]" – 4:06 
 "Seulb" (Ellis/Pass) – 3:24
 "Gee, Baby Ain't I Good to You" (Andy Razaf/Don Redman) – 2:26
 "Try a Little Tenderness"  (Jimmy Campbell/Reginald Connelly/Harry M. Woods)  – 2:17
 "I've Found a New Baby" (Jack Palmer/Spencer Williams) – 4:00
 "Angel Eyes" (Matt Dennis/Earl Brent) – 2:52

Personnel
 Herb Ellis – guitar
 Joe Pass – guitar

References

1974 albums
Herb Ellis albums
Joe Pass albums
Pablo Records albums